New Formulas from the Jazz Lab is an album by American jazz saxophonist Gigi Gryce and trumpeter Donald Byrd featuring tracks recorded in 1957 but not released until 1982 on the French RCA label.

Reception

Allmusic awarded the album 3 stars stating "Altoist Gigi Gryce and trumpeter Donald Byrd were not able to keep their colorful hard bop quintet together for long, but in 1957, they did record 5 worthy albums... The overall results give fresh life to 1950s straight-ahead jazz, although the short life of this group kept it from ever being influential".

Track listing
All compositions by Gigi Gryce except as indicated
 "Exhibit A" - 8:30
 "Capri" - 4:53  
 "Splittin'" (Ray Bryant) - 5:15
 "Ergo the Blues (Hank Jones) - 6:20
 "Passade" (Jones) - 6:25
 "Byrd in Hand" (Barry Harris) - 9:35
 "Ergo the Blues" [alternate take] (Jones) - 7:42 - Does not appear on CD SICJ-26

Personnel 
Gigi Gryce - alto saxophone 
Donald Byrd - trumpet  
Hank Jones - piano
Paul Chambers - bass
Art Taylor - drums

References 

1982 albums
Gigi Gryce albums
Donald Byrd albums
RCA Records albums